Karolina Zofia Laskowska (born 1992) is a British fashion designer. She won the New Designer of the Year award at the 2014 UK Lingerie Awards.

Career
Laskowska started her eponymous fashion brand in 2012 whilst still studying at De Montfort University, due to high demand for her designs. In 2014 she graduated with a BA in Contour Fashion. Her designs were featured in the 2014 London Graduate Fashion Week and have been featured in a number of magazines. In 2016 she founded The Underpinnings Museum, a digital museum dedicated to the history of underwear.

Awards
Laskowska won the New Designer of the Year award at the 2014 UK Lingerie Awards. She also won the Lingerie Edit "Press' Best Brand" award in January 2015.

References

External links
 

Living people
British fashion designers
Lingerie brands
Alumni of De Montfort University
People educated at Notting Hill & Ealing High School
1992 births